Jaroslav Starý (died November 1989) was a Czech fencer. He competed in the individual and team sabre events at the 1948 Summer Olympics.

References

Year of birth missing
1989 deaths
Czech male fencers
Czechoslovak male fencers
Olympic fencers of Czechoslovakia
Fencers at the 1948 Summer Olympics